Hudar may refer to:
 Hudar, Lorestan
 Hudar, South Khorasan
 Hudar, Yazd